The murder of Vera Page is a British unsolved child murder case from the early 1930s. On 14 December 1931, 10-year-old Vera Page was reported missing after she failed to return to her home in Notting Hill, London, from a visit to a nearby relative. The child's body was found two days later in undergrowth in nearby Addison Road. Vera had been raped, then manually strangled to death in a murder described by one detective as "the most terrible in which I had to deal with during my career".

Strong physical and circumstantial evidence existed attesting to the guilt of a 41-year-old labourer named Percy Orlando Rush, whose parents lived in the same house as Vera. However, at a coroner's inquest held on 10 February 1932, a jury determined that insufficient real evidence existed to formally charge Rush with her murder. Officially, the case remains unsolved.

Early life
Vera Isobel Minnie Page was born on 13 April 1921 in Hammersmith, London, the only child born to Charles and Isabel Page. The Page family were working-class. Vera's father was employed as a painter with Great Western Railways and her mother was a housewife. Vera has been described as a popular yet shy and well-behaved girl.

To supplement the family income, Charles and Isabel occasionally allowed lodgers to reside in their home, although these lodgers were always either family members or individuals known to the family. In January 1931, the Page family moved from Chapel Road, Notting Hill (now known as St. Marks Place), to a three-storey house in nearby Blenheim Crescent. The family did not occupy the whole house, but rooms on both the ground floor and basement. Other occupants who resided in the upper floors of this property included a middle-aged couple named Arthur and Annie Rush, who had lived within the property for approximately twenty years.

Disappearance
On 14 December 1931, Vera left her home at 22 Blenheim Crescent at 4:30 p.m. to walk approximately fifty yards to the home of her aunt, Minnie, who lived at number 70 Blenheim Crescent. The purpose of this short journey was to collect two swimming certificates she had been awarded but had left with her aunt the previous day. When Vera had not returned home by 5:30 p.m., her father paid a visit to her aunt, who informed him Vera had collected her swimming certificates and then left her home at approximately 4:45 p.m., intending to return home in time for her evening meal. Having first visited the homes of all of Vera's friends and relatives in the hope his daughter may be with an acquaintance, Charles visited Notting Hill police station to report Vera as missing at 10:25 p.m. Assisted by several friends and neighbours, Vera's parents continued their search for her throughout the evening and into the morning. The following day, the child's physical description was circulated among local police and by the evening of 15 December, local media had been notified of her disappearance.

Via extensive enquiries, investigators determined that at some time between 5 and 6 p.m. on 14 December, Vera had spoken with a school friend as she (Vera) had stood outside a chemist's located at the junction of Blenheim Crescent and Portobello Road, and that Vera had informed her friend of her intentions to purchase soap dominoes on prominent display behind the window as a Christmas present for her parents. The friend had noted Vera had been carrying an envelope in her hand, which her aunt confirmed to investigators had contained her swimming certificates. Shortly after this brief conversation, the friend had left Vera standing in front of the chemist's window. No other verifiable sightings of the child—alone or in the company of any other individual—could be established after this time.

Discovery
On 16 December a milkman discovered Vera's body lying in a patch of shrubbery in the front garden of 89 Addison Road, Kensington, close to Holland Park and approximately one mile from her home. The perpetrator had made no serious effort to conceal Vera's body, beyond making a brief and rudimentary effort to throw handfuls of earth and leaves upon her remains. This fact led investigators to speculate Vera had likely been murdered close to the location of the discovery of her body, and that the perpetrator either lived locally or held extensive geographical knowledge of the neighbourhood. Furthermore, a worn section of ammonia-stained finger bandage was discovered to be lodged firmly against the inner elbow of her right arm; this evidence was only discovered when Vera's body was moved from the crime scene to the mortuary.

Approximately forty hours had elapsed between the time Vera had last been seen alive and the discovery of her remains, yet her body was not rigid, and decomposition was relatively advanced, thus suggesting her body had been stored in a fairly warm environment between the time she had last been seen alive and the discovery of her body. Moreover, it had rained heavily from 3 p.m. to 9 p.m. the previous day, and the climate was still generally moist and misty, yet Vera's clothing had absorbed very little moisture, and solely in locations where her body had touched the soil at the location of her discovery, leading investigators to opine that the child's body could not have lain in the location where she was discovered for more than two hours. This opinion was corroborated by both an occupant of the house who informed investigators that had the body been in the patch of shrubbery before 7:50 a.m., she could not have failed to notice it, and the milkman, who had made his routine delivery to the home at 5:30 a.m. that morning, and was adamant that the body had not lain in this location upon his first visit to the premises.

Autopsy
Vera's body was examined by an eminent pathologist named Sir Bernard Spilsbury, who concluded that she had been raped, then manually strangled to death shortly after the last confirmed sighting of her alive. Her body bore superficial bruising and a welt mark located upon her neck had been inflicted via a ligature, although this injury had evidently occurred after death. Spilsbury also determined that Vera had been deceased for in excess of twenty-four hours prior to the discovery of her body and that, as evidenced by the advanced state of decomposition of her body given the time lapse between her disappearance and discovery, that for the vast majority of this time her body had lain in a warm environment. He also discovered traces of soot and coal dust upon Vera's face, plus spattered candle wax in two locations around her right shoulder and three locations upon the shoulder of Vera's coat. Furthermore, Spilsbury concurred with the initial police conclusion that the section of ammonia-stained finger bandage found lodged against Vera's inner elbow had likely dislodged from the hand of her murderer as he had deposited her body at the crime scene. The candle wax itself was subsequently discovered to be of a different consistency to all candles within Vera's own home.

The consistency of the candle wax discovered upon Vera's clothing, plus the evident coal dust, led Spilsbury to the conclusion that the girl's body had likely been hidden in either a coal shed or cellar prior to her body being discarded at Addison Road, and that this shed or cellar most likely had no electric light, as evidenced by the presence of the candle wax also found upon Vera's clothing.

Investigation
Vera's murder caused extensive public indignation and police mounted an intense operation to apprehend her murderer, conducting extensive door-to-door enquiries throughout the vicinity of her disappearance and discovery and launching extensive media appeals to the public for information to assist in their enquiries. Over 1,000 people would be formally questioned in relation to the murder, and several thousand witness statements obtained by police throughout their subsequent enquiries.

As Vera was a shy child, investigators theorised she had likely been abducted and murdered by an individual she had known and trusted, and that this individual had lured her to a warm room where he had proceeded to rape and murder her before stowing her body in a coal cellar, as indicated by the extensive coal dust upon her clothes. This individual had subsequently retrieved Vera's body from the coal cellar at or shortly before dawn on 16 December and proceeded to transport her body to Addison Road, inadvertently removing the finger bandage from his little finger as he removed his hands from beneath the child's arms. A Mrs. Margaret Key informed investigators that at approximately 6:40 a.m. on 16 December, she had observed an individual whose physical appearance fit that of a local man named Percy Orlando Rush pushing a wheelbarrow laden with a large bundle covered with a distinctive red table-cloth with a knitted fringe walking in the direction of Addison Road.

The day following the discovery of Vera's body, a woman living close to Addison Road named Kathleen Short brought a child's red beret to the Notting Hill police station, stating she had found the item at approximately 9:30 p.m. the previous evening at a location investigators noted was quite close to where Vera had last been seen alive. This beret was identified by Vera's parents as belonging to their daughter, and was noted to smell of paraffin (although this odour may have been caused by Short initially storing the beret beneath a sink in her scullery). Short also informed investigators that close to the scene of her discovery, she had also located several sections of torn paper which she had collected and discarded, and a section of candle which she had herself used then also discarded. By 21 December, police enquiries had also produced an eyewitness who stated that on the morning of the discovery of Vera's body, the door to a coal shed close to Addison Road had been left unlocked and ajar, when on all other dates, it would invariably have been closed and locked.

The coal cellar in question, located close to the house on Addison Road where Vera's body was discovered, had no electric light, giving credibility to Spilsbury's theory that the child had either been murdered, and/or her body stored, in a basement or coal cellar with no electric light, and that her murderer had likely illuminated the scene via candlelight. Investigators gave strong support to the theory the girl's body had been temporarily concealed in this cellar after her murder, then transported via wheelbarrow to the location of her subsequent discovery.

Percy Rush
Percy Orlando Rush was a 41-year-old married man who lived close to Blenheim Crescent and who had worked as a flannel washer in a launderette in Earl's Court for two years. Rush's parents lived in the upper floors of 22 Blenheim Crescent, and he and his wife had lived in the premises until 1925, although after their relocation to nearby Talbot Road he had continued to regularly visit his parents, having a key to their home. Rush freely admitted to having known Vera—whom he described as "a nice little girl"—although he claimed to have not seen her for approximately three weeks before her disappearance.

In Rush's occupation he had come into contact with ammonia on an almost daily basis. Furthermore, Rush had injured the little finger on his left hand in his workplace less than a week before Vera's murder.

Formal questioning
Despite his protestations of innocence, Rush quickly became the prime suspect in Vera's murder. He was initially questioned at Notting Hill police station on 18 December, where he freely admitted to having worn a finger bandage since injuring the little finger of his left hand approximately one week previously. According to Rush, after injuring his finger at work in early December he had made a rough bandage for the wound, although his wife had made a more compact and comfortable bandage for him from their domestic supply of bandage that same evening so that the ammonia he came into contact with at work did not aggravate the wound. Nonetheless, Rush claimed to have disposed of this second bandage in his fireplace on 11 December.

Sections of Rush's claims regarding his finger bandage were confirmed by several of his colleagues, who told investigators Rush had indeed injured the little finger of his left hand on 9 December, and had returned to work the next day wearing a homemade bandage to protect the wound against ammoniated water. Nonetheless, these colleagues were uncertain as to whether he had been wearing the bandage on 14 December.

A search of Rush's Talbot Road home had uncovered sections of bandage, plus a distinctive red table-cloth with a knitted fringe which had likely been used to cover Vera's body as he had transported her remains from the coal shed to the garden of 89 Addison Road. A forensic examination of the consistency of candle wax discovered upon Vera's right shoulder revealed the substance to be identical to that upon both a used candle recovered from Rush's home and upon an examination of wax discovered upon his own overcoat. Furthermore, this overcoat was found to contain traces of coal dust and semen.

The ammonia-soaked finger bandage recovered from the crime scene was found to be a perfect fit upon Rush's injured finger, although Rush remained adamant he had not worn any form of bandage upon his finger since 11 December, explaining to investigators he had simply wished to "harden the wound". Furthermore, Rush freely admitted to having visited his parents at 22 Blenheim Crescent on an almost weekly basis, and to have known Vera, although he remained adamant he had not seen the child for "about three weeks" prior to the date of her disappearance.

The finger bandage recovered at the crime scene was subjected to further forensic analysis by the Home Office analyst, Dr. Roche Lynch, who determined that it had been used to conceal a suppurating wound and that the bandage had been soaked in ammonia on at least one occasion. Nonetheless, Dr. Lynch stated that, having also examined this bandage with the assistance of ultra violet light, he had formed the conclusion that the material was of a different consistency than bandage and lint samples recovered by investigators during their formal search of Rush's home.

Procedural flaw
A Notting Hill superintendent named George Cornish would later state that during their initial interrogation of Rush, when he had simply been one of several potential suspects, officers had informed him of the finger bandage found at the crime scene. Superintendent Cornish would later state officers had informed Rush to voluntarily hand over all samples of bandage at his home, and he had complied with what Cornish later described as a disturbing "faint smile" upon his face. Shortly thereafter, police conducted their formal search of his home. Superintendent Cornish later confirmed this procedural error had been a crucial mistake which had likely allowed Rush to dispose of any bandage of the type he had worn on the day of Vera's murder.

Coroner's inquest
Though his movements on the date of the murder were never independently corroborated, at the subsequent coroner's inquest held on 10 February 1932, Rush claimed that on 14 December, his wife, Daisy, had been absent from the family home until the early evening and that he had opted to go shopping in Kensington after finishing work as he did not wish to be alone in the family home. He claimed to have returned home at approximately 8:30 p.m. and that his wife had returned home shortly thereafter. The two had gone to sleep at approximately 10:15 p.m. Rush further claimed to have not visited his parents on Monday 14 December, although he did admit he had typically visited his parents on a Monday. In response to specific allegations from the coroner that he had intentionally lured Vera to the coal shed close to Addison Road where he had then proceeded to rape, then strangle the child to death before later discarding her body in the front garden of 89 Addison Road, Rush became emphatic in his denials, claiming not to have known Vera as well as his initial witness statement to police had suggested and stating he had only ever spoken to Vera once.

No specific eyewitness accounts existed to place Rush in Vera's company on the day of her death, and no chemist could recall having sold bandages of the type discovered upon Vera's body to Rush. Furthermore, the coal shed in which police alleged Vera had likely been murdered and/or her body stored before being disposed of at 89 Addison Road had been vacated five days before her murder. The previous owner, Thomas O'Connor, said he had taken the door's padlock with him.

Acquittal
Ultimately, the jury determined that insufficient evidence existed to formally charge Rush with Vera's murder and reached a formal verdict of murder by person or persons unknown after just five minutes of deliberation. In response to this verdict, many women in the gallery openly booed and shook their fists at Rush, vocally declaring him to be a blatant liar.

Aftermath
No individual was ever charged with the murder of Vera Page. Percy Rush himself died of natural causes in Ealing in the autumn of 1961.

See also

 Capital punishment in the United Kingdom
 Child abduction
 Child abuse
 Child sexual abuse
 Cold case
 List of solved missing person cases
 Unsolved murders in the United Kingdom

Notes

References

Cited works and further reading

External links 
 Article pertaining to the murder of Vera Page at truecrimelibrary.com
 Contemporary news article pertaining to the coroner's inquest into the murder of Vera Page 
 Unsolved-murders.co.uk case file pertaining to the murder of Vera Page

1930s murders in London
1931 in London
1931 murders in the United Kingdom
Child sexual abuse in the United Kingdom
Deaths by person in London
December 1931 events
Female murder victims
Formerly missing people
Incidents of violence against girls
Murder in London
Rape in England
Unsolved murders in London